Robert Bryant (born 14 June 1958) is an Australian former water polo player who competed in the 1980 Summer Olympics and in the 1984 Summer Olympics.

References

1958 births
Living people
Australian male water polo players
Olympic water polo players of Australia
Water polo players at the 1980 Summer Olympics
Water polo players at the 1984 Summer Olympics